The PASTA domain is a small protein domain that can bind to the beta-lactam ring portion of various β-lactam antibiotics. The domain was initially discovered in 2002 by Yeats and colleagues as a region of sequence similarity found in penicillin binding proteins and PknB-like kinases found in some bacteria. The name is an acronym derived from PBP and Serine/Threonine kinase Associated domain.

Structure
The PASTA domain adopts a structure composed of an alpha-helix followed by three beta strands. Recent structural studies show that the extracellular region of PknB (protein kinase B) that is composed of four PASTA domains shows a linear arrangement of the domains.

Species distribution
PASTA domains are found in a variety of bacterial species including gram-positive Bacillota and Actinomycetota.

References 

Protein domains